Kevin James Langley (born 24 May 1964) is an English former professional footballer who played as a midfielder. He made 427 appearances in the Football League, including a club record 317 for Wigan Athletic.

Life and career
Born in St Helens, Lancashire, Langley was working as a painter and decorator when he wrote to Wigan Athletic asking for a trial which resulted in him being offered an apprenticeship. He made his first-team debut aged 17 in September 1981, and over the next five years he played 160 league games for the club. He was part of the team that won the Associate Members' Cup in 1985. Before the 1986–87 season, Howard Kendall's Everton paid £120,000 for his services. Although Langley played 16 league matches, contributing to the club winning the First Division championship, he left the club in March 1987 for Manchester City. His stay at City was almost as brief, and included a spell on loan at Chester City before joining Birmingham City in March 1988. After two-and-a-half years at the club, by which time they were in their second season in the Third Division, he returned to Wigan Athletic, where he went on to play another 157 league games, making a club record 317 in total.

Released at the end of the 1993–94 season, he joined League of Wales side Bangor City, contributing to them winning the league championship and representing them in the 1995–96 UEFA Cup. Appointed player-manager in November 1996, he left the club at the end of the 1996–97 season.

He moved on to a variety of non-league clubs, as player, player-manager or manager, and has been employed by Wigan Athletic as a coach at their Centre of Excellence. In 2011, he was briefly manager of Northwich Villa.

References
General
 
Specific

1964 births
Living people
Footballers from St Helens, Merseyside
English footballers
Association football midfielders
Wigan Athletic F.C. players
Everton F.C. players
Manchester City F.C. players
Chester City F.C. players
Birmingham City F.C. players
Halifax Town A.F.C. players
Bangor City F.C. players
Flint Town United F.C. players
Witton Albion F.C. players
Runcorn F.C. Halton players
Congleton Town F.C. players
Kidsgrove Athletic F.C. players
English Football League players
Cymru Premier players
English football managers
Bangor City F.C. managers
Kidsgrove Athletic F.C. managers
Witton Albion F.C. managers
Congleton Town F.C. managers
Northwich Villa F.C. managers
Cymru Premier managers
Wigan Athletic F.C. non-playing staff
Winsford United F.C. managers